is the first live video album by Japanese entertainer Miho Nakayama. Released through King Records on July 21, 1986, the video was recorded at Nakayama's debut concert at the Nakano Sun Plaza on April 5, 1986.

The video was compiled in the 2003 box set Miho Nakayama Complete DVD Box. It was also remastered in HD and released as a bonus Blu-ray disc on the limited edition release of Nakayama's 2020 compilation album All Time Best.

Track listing

Album version 

The audio version of the concert was released on August 1, 1986. It peaked at No. 19 on Oricon's albums chart and sold over 48,000 copies.

Track listing

Personnel
 Miho Nakayama – vocals
 Birthday – backing musicians
 Simon – backing vocals
 Dos Dancers – backing vocals

Charts

References

External links
  (video)
  (audio)
 
 

1986 live albums
1986 video albums
Miho Nakayama albums
Japanese-language live albums
Japanese-language video albums
King Records (Japan) albums
Albums recorded at Nakano Sun Plaza